Yang Chao-hsiang (born 5 November 1947) is a Taiwanese politician and educator currently serving as President of Fo Guang University. Previously he served as Minister of Examination from 2008 to 2010, Minister of Education from 1999 to 2000, and Director of Examination from 1997 to 1999.

Early life 
Yang was born on 5 November 1947 in Xizhi Township, Taipei County, Taiwan. Yang attended Fuxing Middle School and he attended the High School attached to National Taiwan Normal University.

Education 
Yang earned his bachelor's degree in education from National Taiwan Normal University in 1970. Yang then moved to the United States to commence graduate studies, first earning a master's degree from the Minnesota State University in 1975 and then doctor's degree from Pennsylvania State University in 1978.

Career 
Yang started his career in teaching. Yang was an assistant professor at Arkansas State University in Arkansas. After Yang returned to Taiwan, he became an assistant professor at the National Taiwan Normal University.

In 1986, Yang entered politics as the Ministry of Education. In 1997 he was promoted to become Minister of the Research, Development and Evaluation Commission, a position he held until 1999, when he was appointed Minister of Education. After leaving office, he became a member of the Standing Committee of the Kuomintang.

In September 2008 he was appointed Minister of Examination, and served until August 2010.

On August 2, 2010, he was hired by Hsing Yun as President of Fo Guang University.

On January 1, 2010, he was offered a post of President's Council of Advisors.

References

External links

1947 births
Living people
National Taiwan Normal University alumni
Pennsylvania State University alumni
Taiwanese educators
Politicians of the Republic of China on Taiwan from Taipei
Taiwanese Ministers of Education
Minnesota State University, Mankato alumni